Agenzia Giornalistica RCS, abbreviated as AGR, is an important Italian news agency owned by the Italian media conglomerate RCS MediaGroup, based in Milan, Italy, with two offices in Rome and Florence.

Produces news and weather bulletins to web portals, local and national newspapers, radio stations and television networks.

References

External links 
 "Who we are"

RCS MediaGroup
News agencies based in Italy
Mass media in Milan